HMS Minstrel was an  built by John I. Thornycroft & Company, Woolston, that was lent to the Imperial Japanese Navy (IJN) from 1917–1919. In the IJN she was named Sendan (栴檀)（せんだん).

Construction and design
The British Admiralty ordered 20  destroyers as part of the 1909–1910 shipbuilding programme for the Royal Navy, with four (and Minstrel) ordered from John I. Thornycroft & Company.

Displacement was  normal and  full load. The ship's machinery consisted of four Yarrow boilers feeding steam to Parsons steam turbines which drove three propeller shafts. The ship had a crew of 72 officers and enlisted.

Gun armament consisted of two  BL Mk VIII guns, one on the ship's forecastle and one aft, and two 12-pounder (76 mm) QF 12 cwt guns carried in the waist position between the first two funnels. Torpedo armament consisted of two  torpedo tubes, with two reload torpedoes carried. The torpedo tubes were aft of the funnels, mounted singly with a searchlight position between them. By 1918, a 3-pounder (47 mm) anti aircraft gun was fitted, and depth charges were carried.

Minstrel was laid down at Thornycoft's Woolston, Southampton shipyard on 11 March 1910, and was launched on 2 February 1911. Minstrel reached a speed of  during sea trials, and was completed in May 1911.

Service  
On 20 July 1911, Minstrel having being detached from her flotilla, (which was on passage from Cromarty to Portland) to make her way independently to Southampton, ran aground off Langston Bar. Kennedy was severely reprimanded.  

On the outbreak of the First World War in August 1914, the 2nd Destroyer Flotilla, including Minstrel, joined the newly established Grand Fleet.  The 2nd Flotilla's destroyers suffered frequent failures of the ship's steering gear during the winter of 1914–15. Minstrel remained part of the 2nd Destroyer Flotilla until December 1915, then transferring to the 5th Destroyer Flotilla, part of the Mediterranean Fleet, escorting troop transports on their passage to Malta.

On  the destroyer was lent to the IJN 2nd Special Squadron and renamed Sendan (Eng: Chinese berry). . She was released on 17 January 1919 and returned to the British Navy at Plymouth Harbour.

Disposal
Following the end of the war, pre-war destroyers like the Acorns were quickly laid up into reserve. On 1 December 1921, she was sold for dismantling.

References

 
 
 
 
 
 
 
 
  
 
 

 

Acorn-class destroyers
World War I destroyers of the United Kingdom
1911 ships